Laura Kraut (born November 14, 1965 in Camden, South Carolina) is an American show jumping competitor and Olympic champion.

At the 2008 Summer Olympics in Beijing, Kraut won the gold medal as part of the United States team with her horse Cedric in team jumping, together with McLain Ward, Will Simpson, and Beezie Madden.

In 2010 Kraut was featured in the television series A Rider's Story
along with fellow Olympian McLain Ward.

Kraut has been recognized for her charitable contributions with equestrian-based charity, JustWorld International.

Accomplishments

2018 

 World Equestrian Games, Tryon, NC, Team Gold/Zeremonie

2013
 95,000 euro Internationales PfingstTurnier Wiesbaden

2009
 150,000 euro Grand Prix of Madrid, Madrid, Spain, 1st/Anthem
 2010 Grand prix of Chantilly. Cedric.
 2011 Finale Grand Prix Florida. Cedric

2008
 US Olympic Trials, Wellington, FL, 1st/Cedric
 Beijing Olympics, Hong Kong, Team Gold/Cedric
 $500,000 Grand Prix of Charlotte, Charlotte, NC, 1st/Anthem
 Masters Class, Antwerpen, Belgium, 1st/Miss Independent
 Brussels Grand Prix, Brussels, Belgium, 1st/Miss Independent
 Credit Suisse Grand Prix, Geneva, Switzerland, 1st/Miss Independent
 Olympia, London, England, 1st/Miss Independent

2007
 CSIO *****Madrid, Madrid, Spain, 1st/Anthem
 CSIO ***** Rotterdam, Rotterdam, Netherlands, 1st/Anthem
 CSI *** Belfast, Belfast, Northern Ireland, 1st/Anthem
 CSI*** Hachenburg, Hachenburg, Germany, 1st/Cedric

2006
 World Equestrian Games Team Silver, Aachen, Germany Miss Independent
 Samsung Super League Team Silver, Miss Independent

2005
 $75,000 Cosequin Florida Open, Wellington, FL, 1st/Miss Independent
 $60,000 Lincoln Idle Dice Classic, Wellington, FL, 1st/Anthem
 Samsung Super League Team Member, Baule, France, Aachen, Germany, team 1st 
 Rome, Italy, Hickstead, England, team 2nd/Anthem & Miss Independent
 $100,000 Washington International President’s Cup, 1st/Anthem

2004
 $75,000 Grand Prix of Tampa CSI-W, Tampa, FL 10th/Allegiance
 $25,000 WEG Challenge Cup Round 8, Tampa, FL 10th/Allegiance
 $50,000 Samsung Nations Cup, Wellington, FL 2nd/Allegiance
 $60,000 Idle Dice Challenge, Wellington, FL 6th/Allegiance
 $25,000 WEF Challenge Series, Wellington, FL 6th/Allegiance
 $25,000 National Speed Stake, Wellington, FL 4th/Liberty
 Super League Team Member

2003

 Budweiser Grand Prix de Penn National, Harrisburg, PA 2nd/Anthem
 Grand Prix of Minnesota, Minneapolis, MN 1st, 2nd/Wet Paint
 $25,000 New Albany Classic, New Albany, Ohio 1st/Quickstar II Z
 $150,000 Prudential Financial Grand Prix, Bridgehampton, NY 7th/Allegiance
 $25,000 Sally Hansen Grand Prix, Bridgehampton, NY 2nd/Quickstar II Z
 Russell Fortune Grand Prix, Zionsville, IN 1st/Quickstar II Z
 $40,000 Kentucky Classic Grand Prix, Lexington, KY 3rd/Milano
 $25,000 Lexington Classic, Lexington, KY 5th/Milano
 $100,000 American Jumping Classic, Kings Mills, OH 4th/Anthem
 BMO Financial Group Nations Cup, Calgary, Canada 3rd/Anthem
 Pan American Games Selection Trial 4 4th/Anthem
 $50,000 Commonwealth Grand Prix, Lexington, KY 4th/Anthem
 $100,000 U.S. Open CH CSIO****, Wellington, FL 4th/Allegiance
 $75,000 Florida Open CSI***/W, Wellington, FL 8th/Anthem
 $75,000 Zada Enterprises Grand Prix CSI***, Wellington, FL 2nd/Anthem
 $25,000 WEF Challenge Series, Wellington, FL 2nd/Allegiance
 $50,000 Idle Dice Classic, Wellington, FL 5th/Anthem
 $25,000 Kilkenny WEF Challenge Cup, Wellington, FL 3rd/Allegiance
 $25,000 WEF Challenge Cup II CSI, Wellington, FL 4th/May
 $25,000 WEF Challenge Cup I CSI**, Wellington, FL 6th/Liberty
 7th/Anthem
 USOC Jack Kelly Fair Play Award
 World Cup Final, Las Vegas, NV Tie 5th/Anthem

2002
 World Cup Final, Leipzig, Germany 17th/Anthem
 Grand Prix, Rome, Italy 2nd/Anthem
 Bank of Montreal Nations Cup, Calgary, Canada 1st/Anthem
 Pennsylvania Big Jump, Harrisburg, Pennsylvania, U.S. 1st/Allegiance
 Grand Prix of Minnesota, St. Paul, Minnesota, U.S. 1st/May
 $200,000 Atco Power Queen Elizabeth ll Cup, Spruce Meadows, Calgary, Alberta, Canada 2nd /Liberty
 Samsung Nations Cup, Lucerne, Switzerland 1st (tie)/Liberty
 $105,705 Loro Piana Grand Prix, Rome, Italy 2nd/Anthem
 Samsung Nations Cup, Wellington, Florida, U.S. Team 1st
 $25,000 Jaguar/Land Rover WEF Challenge Cup 1st/Anthem
 $200,000 Budweiser American Invitational, Tampa, Florida, U.S. 2nd/Anthem
 $25,000 WEF Challenge IV, Wellington, Florida, U.S. 1st/Anthem

2001
 Samsung Nations Cup, Royal Winter Fair-Toronto, Ontario, Canada 1st/Anthem
 Budweiser Grand Prix de Penn National, Harrisburg, PA 1st/Anthem
 $50,000 Budweiser Grand Prix of Indianapolis, Zionsville, IN 1st/Liberty
 $100,000 Cosequin US Open Jumper Championship, Wellington, FL 1st/Liberty
 $75,000 American Jumping Classic, Kings Mills, OH 1st/Anthem
 $50,000 Commonwealth Grand Prix, Lexington, KY 1st/Liberty

2000
 Olympic Games, Sydney, Australia Team 6th/Liberty
 $125,000 Budweiser Grand Prix of New York, New York, NY 3rd/Anthem
 $50,000 Budwesier Grand Prix De Penn National, Harrisburg, PA 1st/Anthem
 $100,000 Rolex/U.S. Show Jumping Championship, Gladstone, NJ 1st/Liberty
 $100,000 Cosequin Wellington Finale CSI-W, Wellington, FL 2nd/Liberty
 Olympic Selection Trials, Gladstone, NJ, the Oaks/Blenheim & Del Mar, CA 3rd/Liberty
 $100,000 Mayor’s Jewelers U.S. Open Jumper Championship, Miami, FL 2nd/Liberty
 $50,000 Mary Rena Murphy Grand Prix, Lexington, KY 1st/Simba Run
 $30,000 Kentucky Grand Prix, Lexington, KY 1st/Athletico

1998
 Nortel Queen Elizabeth II Cup, Calgary Alberta, Canada 1st/Simba Run

1997
 $30,000 Motor City Grand Prix, Detroit, MI 1st/Classified

1996
 $50,000 Budweiser Indianapolis Grand Prix 1st/Simba Run

1995
 $35,000 North American Grand Prix 1st/Felix
 $30,000 Kentucky Spring Classic, Lexington, KY 1st/Simba Run

1992
 Alternate, Olympic Games, Barcelona, Spain/Simba Run

1988
 $50,000 Sweet Charity Farm Grand Prix, Carmel, IN 1st/Athletico

References

 

1965 births
American female equestrians
Equestrians at the 2000 Summer Olympics
Equestrians at the 2008 Summer Olympics
Living people
Olympic gold medalists for the United States in equestrian
People from Camden, South Carolina
Medalists at the 2008 Summer Olympics
Equestrians at the 2020 Summer Olympics
Medalists at the 2020 Summer Olympics
Olympic silver medalists for the United States in equestrian
21st-century American women
20th-century American women